FC Bayern (meaning football clubs named after the German state of Bavaria) usually refers to FC Bayern Munich

It may also refer to one of the following:
 FC Bayern Alzenau
 SpVgg Bayern Hof

ru:Бавария (футбольный клуб)